HSBC Tower is a skyscraper office building located on Paseo de la Reforma in Colonia Cuauhtémoc, Cuauhtémoc, Mexico City, Mexico, which is the headquarters of HSBC Mexico. It is located opposite the Angel of Independence, and is home to the around 2,800 HSBC Mexico staff. Construction was completed in 2006, at a cost of around US$150 million. There are 23 office floors and 12 parking levels in the  tower, which is one of the tallest in Mexico City.

The HSBC Tower is the first of its type of environmentally friendly buildings in Latin America. It was the first in Latin America to be given LEED (Leadership in Energy and Environmental Design) gold certification from the US Green Building Council.

Opening
The inauguration of the new head office took place on 5 April 2006, attended by President of Mexico Vicente Fox Quesada, the President's wife Marta Sahagún, Secretary of Finance Francisco Gil Diaz, Banco de México Guillermo Ortiz Martínez, HSBC Mexico CEO Sandy Flockhart, HSBC Group Chief Executive Stephen Green, HSBC Group Chairman Sir John Bond and Deputy Chairman and senior non-executive Director Baroness Dunn.

Notable features
HSBC's environmental principles mean that the building has been designed from the start to include the best available technology to reduce the consumption of water and electricity, including low consumption bathroom furniture, waterless urinals, rain collection, water treatment plant and efficient use of non-drinkable water. HSBC claim that the building will consume 55% less water and 40% less energy than comparable structures.

Credit Transforms to Mexico
Credit Transforms to Mexico is a mural which was unveiled by President Fox and Sandy Flockhart in the reception area of the building.

Stephen and Stitt

In common with other HSBC head office buildings, the HSBC Tower has a pair of bronze lions guarding the main entrance. These are copies of those which have stood outside the HSBC Hong Kong headquarters building at 1 Queen's Road Central since 1935.

See also

 HSBC
 A list of other towers named HSBC Tower

Notes

External links

 HSBC Mexico
 HSBC Tower entry at skyscraperpage.com
 HSBC Tower entry at gisca.com.mx

Skyscraper office buildings in Mexico City
HSBC buildings and structures
Cuauhtémoc, Mexico City
Paseo de la Reforma
Leadership in Energy and Environmental Design gold certified buildings
Office buildings completed in 2006